The 1911 Wyoming Cowboys football team was an American football team that represented the University of Wyoming as a member of the Rocky Mountain Conference (RMC) during the 1911 college football season. In their third season under head coach Harold I. Dean, the Cowboys compiled a 4–3–1 overall record (2–3 against conference opponents), finished fifth in the RMC, and outscored opponents by a total of 139 to 53. S. M. Fuller was the team captain

Schedule

References

Wyoming
Wyoming Cowboys football seasons
Wyoming Cowboys football